Prague Zoological Garden (Czech: Zoologická zahrada hl. m. Prahy) is a zoo in Prague, Czech Republic. It was opened in 1931 with the goal to "advance the study of zoology, protect wildlife, and educate the public" in the district of Troja in the north of Prague.

The zoo is rated as the seventh best zoo in the world by Forbes Travel Guide in 2007, and is rated as the fifth best in the world by TripAdvisor.

The zoo has contributed significantly to saving Przewalski's horse; for many years, it was the leading breeder of the subspecies. The zoo director is Miroslav Bobek.

History
The idea for a zoological garden in Prague was first proposed in 1881 in a newspaper article by Count Sweerts-Spork, on the occasion of the marriage of Crown Prince Rudolf of Austria and Princess Stéphanie of Belgium.

In 1919, at a meeting of the advisory board for mathematics and natural sciences at the Ministry of Education and National Enlightenment, a committee was established to start the preparatory work on the establishment of the zoo. The zoo was opened to the public on 28 September 1931.

In 1938, the first artificially bred Andean condor in the world was hatched and reared, and the first artificially bred polar bear, a female named Ilun, followed in 1942. In 1959 Dr. Zdeněk Veselovský was appointed as director of the zoo. Under his leadership, the zoo achieved some world-class successes in the area of breeding and scientific research.

In 1971 a new pavilion opened for large mammals, including elephants, hippos and rhinos, followed by a big cat pavilion in 1991.

In 2001 the first artificial breeding of a Przewalski's Horse in the world took place at the zoo.

In 2002 Prague suffered the worst floods in its history. A large part of the zoo was flooded and 134 animals died. Well known is the story of Gaston, a sea lion, which the Vltava and Elbe rivers took to Germany, where Gaston died of total exhaustion. However, thanks to a big wave of solidarity and donations, Prague Zoo greatly flourished in the next decade.

In 2004 the country's largest and most expensive animal pavilion, named the "Indonesian Jungle", was opened, and the first Western gorilla was born in Czech Republic, named Moja. This was followed in 2007 by the first breeding of a Komodo dragon in Prague Zoo. In 2009 a new exhibition for brown fur seals was opened, with an enlarged swimming pool and a grandstand. The following year saw a Texas tortoise bred in Europe for the first time.

In 2011 Moja, a western gorilla famous from the multimedia project The Revealed, was moved to Cabarceno Natural Park in Spain. Four Przewalski's horses were transported to Mongolia to be released into the wild as part of Return of the Wild Horses reintroduction and in situ conservation project.

In 2012 the zoo saw its highest number of babies born, numbering 1,557 from 211 species, including the world's first breeding of the crowned river turtle and the rufous-cheeked laughingthrush, as well as Prague Zoo's first breeding of the red panda.
In 2013 a large new Elephant Valley pavilion was introduced and the first elephant was born in Prague Zoo, named Sita. The zoo was flooded in June the same year for a second time, but most animals were evacuated in time.

In 2014, a pavilion was opened for 33 critically endangered Chinese giant salamanders, including three adults. The collection features the largest of such salamanders in Europe.

After 13 years of waiting, the zoo is among the three unique zoos in the world, which have a breeding pair of Lesser Antillean iguana.

In 2023, the Zoo saw the first birth of a Chinese Pangolin in captivity. The pangolin was born in February and weighed in at 135 grams. The birth gives hope that the creature can be rescued from its current status on the endangered species list.

Gallery

Notes

External links

Prague Zoo on zooinstitutes.com

1931 establishments in Czechoslovakia
Buildings and structures in Prague
Tourist attractions in Prague
Zoos established in 1931
Zoos in the Czech Republic
Gardens in Prague
20th-century architecture in the Czech Republic